Breyite is a high pressure calcium silicate mineral (CaSiO3) found in diamond inclusions. It is the second most abundant inclusion after ferropericlase, for diamonds with a deep Earth origin. Its occurrence can also indicate the host diamond's super-deep origin. This mineral is named after German mineralogist, petrologist and geochemist Gerhard P. Brey.

References 

Silicate minerals
Calcium minerals
High pressure science
Diamond